Laurence Allen Johnson is an English former cricketer active from 1953 to 1972 who played for Northamptonshire (Northants). He was born in West Horsley, Surrey on 12 August 1936. He appeared in 156 first-class matches as a righthanded batsman and wicketkeeper. He scored 1,574 runs with a highest score of 50 and claimed 329 victims including 68 stumpings.

Notes

1936 births
English cricketers
Northamptonshire cricketers
Marylebone Cricket Club cricketers
Living people